The Avon Fissure Fill, also known as the Bristol Fissure Fill or Tytherington Fissure Fill, is a fissure fill in Avon, England (now Bristol) which dates variously from the Norian and Rhaetian stages of the Late Triassic, or possibly as late as the Hettangian stage of the Early Jurassic. The fissure fill at Avon was a sinkhole formed by the dissolution of Lower Carboniferous limestones.

It is paired with the nearby Magnesian Conglomerate; it may have been the same formation as the Magnesian Conglomerate.

Paleofauna

References 

Geologic formations of the United Kingdom
Triassic System of Europe
Norian Stage
Rhaetian Stage
Hettangian Stage
Fossiliferous stratigraphic units of Europe
Paleontology in the United Kingdom